Rajiv Ramesh Kulkarni  (born 25 September 1962, Bombay, Maharashtra) is a former Indian cricketer.  He played domestic cricket for Bombay as a pace and swing bowler.  He took 8 for 111 in the semi-final of the Ranji Trophy in 1982–83, and played in his first One Day International in December 1983.

He was called in shortly before the Test against Australia in his home town of Bombay in October 1986, where he made his Test debut.  He played two more Tests against Pakistan in February 1987, but his Test career ended after these 3 matches.  He played the last of his 10 ODIs, also against Pakistan, in March 1987.  He was selected for the Indian Asia Cup squad in 1990 Asia Cup but did not play a match.

Kulkarni, nicknamed as 'Thommo', is considered to be the fastest Indian bowler of 80's and Sachin Tendulkar had acknowledged the same, in his first interview with Tom Alter. He retired from first-class cricket in 1993, and has a sports equipment business. He stepped down from the Mumbai Cricket Association's (MCA) formed Cricket Improvement Committee (CIC).

References

External links
 

1962 births
Mumbai cricketers
Indian cricketers
India One Day International cricketers
India Test cricketers
West Zone cricketers
Living people
Cricketers from Mumbai